The 2014–15 SWALEC League 1 East was the first season of the new format of the WRU National Leagues. Previously, League 1 was the second tier of club rugby in Wales but since the creation of the WRU National Championship, League 1 is now the third tier. The new structure of the National Leagues also sees the creation of two new League 1 divisions (League 1 East Central and League 1 West Central) bringing the total number of League 1 divisions to five. The league was won by Penallta and the bottom two clubs relegated to League 2 East were Garndiffaith and Fleur De Lys.

Structure 
Each team in the league will play each other twice on a home and away basis for a total of 22 matches played each. Points will be awarded in accordance to the standard scoring system in rugby union - 4 points for a win, 2 points for a draw and 0 for a loss. Teams will also be awarded 1 additional bonus point for scoring 4 or more tries in a match or losing by 7 points or less in a match. The team with the most points at the end of the season will be declared the winners. The winning club will enter a play-off with the winner of League 1 East Central to determine which club is to be promoted to the 2015-16 WRU Championship.

Teams 

 Blaenavon
 Cardiff HSOB
 Fleur De Lys
 Garndiffaith
 Glamorgan Wanderers
 Llanishen
 Nelson
 Penallta
 Rhiwbina
 Risca
 Rumney
 Senghenydd

Standings

Promotion play-off 
The winners of both 1 East (Penallta) and 1 East Central (Beddau) would play-off at a neutral venue to determine which club would be promoted. The game was to be played at Taff's Well's ground, Maes Gwyn.

Beddau are promoted to the Championship.

External links 
 

2014–15 in Welsh rugby union
Wales